Liboria 'Borita' Casas Regueiro (1911–1999) was a Spanish Journalist, playwright and author of children's books, creator of the well-known character Antoñita la Fantástica ("Fantastic Antonia").

In 1948, as a radio announcer on Radio Madrid Borita invented the character Antoñita la Fantástica and went on to write two plays and 12 books which saw moderate success in the 1940s and 1950s.  From 1955 to 1966 Borita was married and lived in Mexico then returned to Spain.

See also
 Spanish literature

References

1911 births
1999 deaths
Spanish children's writers
Spanish women journalists
Spanish women children's writers
20th-century Spanish women writers
Women dramatists and playwrights
20th-century Spanish dramatists and playwrights
20th-century Spanish writers
Spanish women dramatists and playwrights